Hannola is a surname. Notable people with the surname include:

 Matti Hannola (born 1939), Finnish farmer and politician
 Pyry Hannola (born 2001), Finnish footballer

See also
 Hannoa

Finnish-language surnames